Robert Neville Anthony Evans (born 11 June 1947 in Waddington, Lincolnshire) is a British former racing driver from England. He participated in 12 World Championship Formula One Grands Prix, debuting on 1 March 1975.  He scored no championship points. He also competed in numerous non-Championship Formula One races.

Evans followed the usual route through to Formula One, via Formula Ford, Formula 3 and Formula 5000, winning the 1974 Rothmans 5000 European Championship. After a season with the struggling BRM team in 1975, Evans tested and occasionally raced for Lotus the following year.  He subsequently drove a Brabham for RAM in the 1976 British Grand Prix, before he moved to the Aurora F1 Championship in the late 1970s.

Racing record

Complete European F5000 Championship results
(key) (Races in bold indicate pole position; races in italics indicate fastest lap.)

Complete World Sportscar Championship results
(key)

Footnotes

Complete Formula One World Championship results
(key)

Complete Formula One Non-Championship results
(key)

Complete Shellsport International Series results
(key)

Complete European Formula Two Championship results
(key)

Complete British Formula One Championship results
(key) (Races in bold indicate pole position; races in italics indicate fastest lap.)

24 Hours of Le Mans results

References

External links
 
Profile at grandprix.com

1947 births
Living people
English racing drivers
English Formula One drivers
24 Hours of Le Mans drivers
BRM Formula One drivers
Team Lotus Formula One drivers
RAM Racing Formula One drivers
World Sportscar Championship drivers
British Formula One Championship drivers